Schießbergweg is a Bonn Stadtbahn (tram) stop served by lines 62 and 65.

Bonn Straßenbahn stations